Shikar is a 1968 Hindi thriller film produced and directed by Atma Ram. The film is a murder mystery that became a box office hit and its songs were also big hits. It stars Dharmendra, Asha Parekh, Sanjeev Kumar, Helen, Rehman, Johnny Walker, Bela Bose, Ramesh Deo in pivotal roles.
The music of the film was composed by Shankar-Jaikishan and its songs were penned by Hasrat Jaipuri. Asha Bhosle won the Filmfare award for best Female Playback singer, for the Arabic tuned song "Parde Mein Rehne Do, while Lata Mangeshkar and Asha Bhosle sang the duet song "Jabse Laagi Tose Najariya".

Plot
Manager Ajay Singh finds out that a man by the name of Naresh is murdered and informs police inspector Rai, but all the evidence is tampered with at the crime scene and as a result the murderer becomes difficult to trace. From here on, Ajay's life takes a new turn in trying to find the culprit who has murdered Naresh. In the process he meets a young woman, Kiran, whom Ajay had seen at the murder spot with the murder weapon. She is the daughter of a respectable person.

Cast
 Dharmendra as Ajay Singh
 Asha Parekh as Kiran
 Sanjeev Kumar as Inspector Rai
 Helen as Veera
 Rehman as Sharma
 Johnny Walker as Teju
 Bela Bose as Mahua
 Ramesh Deo as Naresh Mathur
 Manmohan as Robby
 Shyam Kumar as Mahua's Father

Soundtrack 
Music by Shankar-Jaikishan, lyrics by Hasrat Jaipuri.

Awards and nominations
1969 Filmfare Awards
Best Supporting Actor - Won - Sanjeev Kumar
Best Female Playback Singer - Won - Asha Bhosle singing "Parde Mein Rahne Do"
Best Comedian - Won - Johnny Walker
Best Sound Design - Won - P. Thakkersey
Best Supporting Actress - Nominated - Helen

Atmaram was Gurudutt's younger brother.

References

External links 
 

1968 films
1960s Hindi-language films
Films scored by Shankar–Jaikishan